Oliver C. Fletcher (February 5, 1923 – May 10, 1994) was an American football guard in the All-America Football Conference (AAFC) for the Los Angeles Dons.  He played college football at the University of Southern California (USC) and drafted in the 20th round of the 1949 NFL Draft by the Washington Redskins.

References

1923 births
1994 deaths
American football guards
Los Angeles Dons players
USC Trojans football players
Players of American football from San Diego